The Waterfield Group is a financial services holding company that was founded in 1928 by Richard H. Waterfield. J. Randall Waterfield, a former manager at Goldman Sachs and grandson of Richard H. Waterfield, serves as the Waterfield Group’s chairman. As of 2000, the Waterfield Group was the largest privately held mortgage company in the US.

The Waterfield Group sold its mortgage company, Waterfield Mortgage, in December 2006 to Sky Financial Group. In 2010, the Federal Deposit Insurance Corporation closed Waterfield Bank, which was majority-owned by the Waterfield Group.

References

External links
 http://www.fdic.gov/bank/individual/failed/waterfield.html
 http://www.marketwatch.com/story/fdic-shuts-bank-of-illinois-and-waterfield-bank-2010-03-05
 http://washington.bizjournals.com/washington/stories/2010/03/01/story3.html
 http://washington.bizjournals.com/washington/stories/2010/03/01/daily78.html

Banks based in Maryland
The Waterfield Group
Waterfield Bank
Waterfield Bank
Bank failures in the United States
2010 in economics